Alyokhnovo is a village in Istrinsky District of Moscow Oblast, Russia.

Rural localities in Moscow Oblast